Iscadia is a genus of moths of the family Nolidae. The genus was erected by Francis Walker in 1857.

Species

References

Nolidae